"Lifesong" is a song recorded by Christian rock band Casting Crowns. Written by Mark Hall and produced by Mark A. Miller, it was released as the lead single from the band's 2005 album of the same name. According to Mark Hall, the lead vocalist of Casting Crowns, "Lifesong" came out of what he found himself saying to students in his church's youth ministry. Compared to the work of rock band U2, the song lyrically points believers towards honoring God in all they do.

"Lifesong" received mostly positive reviews upon its release, with some critics praising the song's musical arrangement. The song was nominated for two awards at the 37th GMA Dove Awards and has been performed by Casting Crowns in concert. It was a hit on Christian radio, topping the Billboard Hot Christian Songs and Hot Christian AC charts as well as the Radio & Records Christian AC and Soft AC/Inspirational charts. It also peaked inside the top 10 on the Radio & Records Christian CHR chart. It ranked at number 21 on the 2000s decade-end Hot Christian Songs chart and number 27 on the decade-end Hot Christian AC chart.

Recording and composition

"Lifesong" was written by Mark Hall and produced by Mark A. Miller. The strings on the song were arranged by Bobby Huff. "Lifesong" was recorded and mixed by Sam Hewitt at Zoo Studio in Franklin, Tennessee. Additional recording was done at Lifesong Studio in McDonough, Georgia. Strings were recorded at Little Big Studio by Boeho Shin and Daewoo Kim. It was mastered by Richard Dodd and engineered by Dale Oliver and John Lewis Lee III.

"Lifesong" is a song with a length of four minutes and 37 seconds; the version of the song on Lifesong has a length of five minutes and sixteen seconds. It is set in common time in the key of A major and has a tempo of 112 beats per minute. Mark Hall's vocal range in the song spans from the low note of A3 to the high note of E5. "Lifesong" has been described as a power ballad and "robust pop", and it has been musically compared to the work of rock band U2, Lyrically, it "points believers towards honoring God in all they do". According to lead vocalist Mark Hall, the song came out of what he found himself saying and praying to the student's in his church's youth ministry.

Critical reception
"Lifesong" received mostly positive reception from music critics. John DiBiase of Jesus Freak Hideout described it as a "musical nod to U2" and felt that the opening of Lifesong with the song was responsible for the album having a "greater appeal" than Casting Crowns' debut record. David McCreary of CCM Magazine called the song a "powerhouse praise number". Russ Breimeier  of Christianity Today, however, felt the song was one of the weakest on the album, calling it "predictable" and criticizing what he perceived as imitation of U2's "Where The Streets Have No Name" and Chris Tomlin's "Forever". At the 37th GMA Dove Awards, "Lifesong" was nominated for Song of the Year and Pop/Contemporary Recorded Song of the Year. It did not win in either category.

Release and chart performance

"Lifesong" was released as a digital single on July 19, 2005, with Josh Bates' "Perfect Day" as its B-side. It was released to Christian AC, Christian CHR, and Soft AC/Inspirational radio on July 30, 2005. "Lifesong" debuted at number 21 on the Billboard Hot Christian Songs chart for the chart week of August 6, 2005. It advanced to number 10 in its third week and to number two in its fourth week. In its seventh chart week, "Lifesong" advanced to the number one position on the chart. It spent a total of 10 non-consecutive weeks atop the chart and 34 weeks on the chart in total. "Lifesong" also peaked at number one on the Billboard Hot Christian AC chart, the Radio & Records Christian AC chart, and the Radio & Records Soft AC/Inspirational chart. It peaked at number seven on the Radio & Records Christian CHR chart.

"Lifesong" ranked at number 12 on the 2005 year-end Hot Christian Songs and Hot Christian AC charts and at number 19 on the 2005 year-end Radio & Records Christian AC chart. It ranked at number 16 on the 2006 year-end Hot Christian Songs chart and at number 17 on the 2006 year-end Hot Christian AC chart. It also ranked at number 21 on the decade-end Hot Christian Songs chart and at number 27 on the decade-end Hot Christian AC chart. "Lifesong" was included on the compilation albums WOW Hits 2007 and Wow: Best of 2007. A live version of the song was included on Casting Crowns' live album Lifesong Live.

Live performances
Casting Crowns have performed "Lifesong" live in concert. At a concert at Continental Airlines Arena in East Rutherford, New Jersey, Casting Crowns opened their setlist with the song, accompanied by over 100 robed choir members. At a concert on November 12, 2005 at Stabler Arena in Bethlehem, Pennsylvania, Casting Crowns opened their setlist with the song. They performed "Lifesong" as the eighteenth song on their setlist at a concert on February 5, 2010 at the Sprint Center in Kansas City, Missouri. At a concert on February 28, 2010 in Hershey, Pennsylvania, Casting Crowns closed out their concert with a performance of "Lifesong". Casting Crowns performed the song as the second of their setlist at a concert on October 29, 2011 at the Peoria Civic Center in Peoria, Illinois.

Track listing
Digital single
"Lifesong" – 4:37
"Perfect Day" (Josh Bates) – 4:10

Album version
"Lifesong" – 5:16

Credits and personnel
Credits adapted from the album liner notes of Lifesong.

Casting Crowns
Hector Cervantes – Electric guitar
Juan DeVevo – Electric guitar, acoustic guitar
Melodee DeVevo – Violin
Hector Cervantes – Piano, keyboard
Mark Hall – Vocals
Chris Huffman – Bass guitar
Andy Williams – Drums

Additional musicians
David Angell – Violin
Monisa Angell – Violin
David Davidson – Contractor, concertmaster
Jack Jezioro – Bass
Anthony Lamarchina – Cello
Sarighani Reist – Cello
Pamela Sixfin – Violin
Mary Vanosdale – Violin
Kristin Wilkinson – Viola

Technical
Richard Dodd – Mastering
Terry Hemmings – Executive producer
Sam Hewitt – Recording, mixing
Bobby Huff – String arrangement
Daewoo Kim – Recording (strings)
John Lewis Lee III – Engineering
Jason McArthur – A&R Coordination
Dale Oliver – Engineering
Mark A. Miller – Producer
Boeho "Bobby" Shin – Recording (strings)

Charts

Weekly charts

Year-end

Decade-end

Release and radio history

References

2005 singles
Casting Crowns songs
Songs written by Mark Hall (musician)
2000s ballads
Pop ballads
Rock ballads